The following is a list of notable events and developments that are related to Philippine sports in 2023.

Events

Athletics
 January 26 – Ernest John Obiena claims the silver medal at the International Jump Meeting Cottbus pole vault event at Lausitz-Arena in Cottbus, Germany, after clearing the 5.77-meter mark.
 January 29 – Ernest John Obiena claims the gold medal at the Perche En Or tournament pole vault event in Roubaix, France, after clearing the 5.82-meter mark.
 February 9 – Ernest John Obiena claims the gold medal at the 2023 Orlen Copernicus Cup pole vault event in Toruń, Poland, after clearing the 5.86-meter mark.
 February 11 – Ernest John Obiena claims the silver medal at the ISTAF Indoor Berlin pole vault event at Mercedes-Benz Arena in Berlin, Germany, after clearing the 5.82-meter mark.
 February 12 – Janry Ubas claims the bronze medal at the Asian Indoor Athletics Championships heptathlon event in Astana, Kazakhstan, after tallying the 5,246 points.

Basketball
 January 12 – President Bongbong Marcos signs into law the naturalization of Barangay Ginebra San Miguel player Justin Brownlee, allowing him to play for the Philippines men's national basketball team.
 January 15 – The Barangay Ginebra San Miguel claims the 2022–23 PBA Commissioner's Cup title after defeating Hong Kong-based guest team Bay Area Dragons 4–3 in a do-or-die seven-game series in front of record-breaking 54,589 gate attendance at the Philippine Arena.

Boxing
 January 6 – Melvin Jerusalem claims the WBO minimumweight title after defeating Masataka Taniguchi via technical knockout in the second round.
 February 12 – Eumir Marcial defeats Ricardo Villalba via technical knockout in the second round, remaining undefeated as a professional boxer at 4–0 record.
 March 5 – Mark Magsayo loses to Brandon Figueroa via unanimous decision for the WBC interim featherweight title at Toyota Arena in Ontario, United States.

Chess
 February 18 – Daniel Quizon claims the ASEAN Chess Championship title after defeating International Master Rolando Nolte in the grand final tournament in Quezon City. He also clinched into grandmaster.

Esports
 January 15 – ECHO Philippines claim the MLBB M4 World Championship title after defeating a fellow Filipino rival and defending champions Blacklist International 4–0 in the grand final tournament in Jakarta, Indonesia.

Football
 February 2 – The Asian Football Confederation re-elects Philippine Football Federation president Mariano Araneta to another four-year term as a representative of the confederation in the FIFA Council.
 February 16 – Philippines Football League defending champions United City F.C. suspend their operations as a professional football club and withdraw from the remainder of the 2022–23 season, citing financial difficulties following a legal dispute with a Singapore-based investor.
 March 1–2 – The FIFA Women's World Cup trophy visits the Philippines for the first time as part of the marketing campaign for the 2023 FIFA Women's World Cup, which the Philippines women's national football team qualified for the first time in the previous year. The trophy was publicly displayed in Glorietta in Makati.

Gymnastics
 February 27 – Carlos Yulo claims the bronze medal at 2023 World Artistic Gymnastics Championships parallel bars event in Cottbus, Germany after scoring 15.166 points.
 March 3 – Carlos Yulo claims the gold medal at 2023 FIG World Cup floor exercise event in Doha, Qatar after scoring 14.833 points.
 March 4 – Carlos Yulo claims the bronze medal at 2023 FIG Artistic World Cup Series vault event in Doha, Qatar after scoring 14.883 points.
 March 12 – Carlos Yulo claim two gold medals at the 2023 FIG World Cup parallel bars and vault events in Baku, Azerbaijan.

Lawn bowls
 February 28 – The Philippine delegation captures three gold and two bronze medals at the 14th Asian Lawn Bowls Championship in Ipoh, Malaysia.

Mixed martial arts
 February 17 – Fritz Biagtan defeats Nurmukhammad Adamkohonov via knockout in the third round at ONE Friday Fights 5 in Bangkok, Thailand.
 February 25 – Danny Kingad defeats Eko Roni Saputra via unanimous decision at ONE Fight Night 7 in Bangkok, Thailand.

Predicted and scheduled events
 May 5–17 – The 814-strong Philippine delegation will participate at the 2023 Southeast Asian Games in Phnom Penh, Cambodia.
 June 3–19 – The Philippines will participate at the 2023 ASEAN Para Games in Phnom Penh, Cambodia.
 July 20–30 (at least) – The Philippines women's national football team will participate at the 2023 FIFA Women's World Cup in Australia and New Zealand. It will be the first time that the Philippines plays at a FIFA World Cup of any gender or age level.
 July 29–August 5 – The 63rd edition of Palarong Pambansa will be held for the first time since  COVID-19 pandemic.
 August 25 – September 10 – The Philippines will co-host the 2023 FIBA Basketball World Cup with Indonesia and Japan. Among the three host countries, the Philippines will host most of the matches, including the final, which will be held at the Philippine Arena in Bocaue, Bulacan. Other matches will take place at the Araneta Coliseum in Quezon City and the Mall of Asia Arena in Pasay.
 September 23 – October 8 – The Philippines will participate at the 2022 Asian Games in Hangzhou, China, initially scheduled for the previous year but was postponed due to the COVID-19 pandemic.
 October 22–28 – The Philippines will participate at the 2022 Asian Para Games in Hangzhou, China, initially scheduled for the previous year but was postponed due to the COVID-19 pandemic.
 November 17–26 – The Philippines will participate at the 2021 Asian Indoor and Martial Arts Games in Bangkok and Chonburi, Thailand, initially scheduled for 2021 but was postponed due to the COVID-19 pandemic.
 December – the Philippines will host the MLBB M5 World Championship, the first time the country will host a Mobile Legends: Bang Bang World Championship.

Deaths
 February 1 – Terry Saldaña (b. 1958), former basketball player
 February 28 – Rob Luna (b. 1985), Esports commentator
 March 1 –  Emmanuel "Boybits" Victoria (b. 1971), former basketball player

See also
2023 in the Philippines
2023 in sports

References

Philippine sport by year
2023 sport-related lists